Tukwila is a suburban city in King County, Washington, United States, located immediately to the south of Seattle. The population was 21,798 at the 2020 census.

Tukwila is a community of communities, with residents of many diverse origins living in the city. A large commercial center draws workers and consumers to the city daily; industry thrives with the confluence of rivers, freeways, railroads, and Seattle–Tacoma International Airport.

History
The earliest people in Tukwila were the Duwamish, who made their homes along the Black and Duwamish rivers. The name "Tukwila" is the Chinook Jargon word for "nut" or "hazelnut", referring to the hazelnut trees that grew in the area. The Duwamish lived in cedar longhouses, hunted and fished, picked wild berries, and used the river for trade with neighboring peoples.

In 1853, the first white settler was Joseph Foster, a Canadian pioneer who had traveled to the Pacific Northwest from Wisconsin. Foster would become known as the "Father of Tukwila" and represented King County in the Washington Territorial Assembly for 22 years. Today, the site of Foster's home on the banks of the Duwamish River is part of Fort Dent Park, which also served as a military base during the 1850s Indian Wars. Foster's name is memorialized in the Foster neighborhood of Tukwila, where Foster High School is located.

In the early years, the small village grew into an agricultural center and remained a trading point in the upper Duwamish River Valley. Population began to grow and industry followed, largely farm-oriented commerce. Early electric trains traveled along Interurban Avenue in Tukwila, connecting to Renton and a line to Tacoma. The Interurban Railroad operated a commuter line from 1902 to 1928, making it possible to travel from Seattle to Tacoma in less than an hour. The first macadam paved road in Washington state was in Tukwila and bears the name of this new method of street paving. One of the earliest paved military roads is located in the city.

Tukwila was incorporated as a city in 1908. The city's first mayor was Joel Shomaker, a newspaperman. Among the city's first council members was Del Adelphia, a famous magician.

Geography
Tukwila is located in western King County at  (47.478243, -122.275432).

Neighborhoods
Tukwila is divided into several neighborhoods by the city government for planning purposes. The 2015 Comprehensive Land Use Plan identifies them as:

 Allentown
 Cascade View
 Duwamish
 Foster
 Foster Point
 McMicken
 Riverton
 Ryan Hill
 Southcenter (Urban Center)
 Thorndyke
 Tukwila Hill

Demographics

2010 census
As of the census of 2010, there were 19,107 people, 7,157 households, and 4,124 families living in the city. The racial makeup of the city was 43.9% White (37.6% Non-Hispanic White), 17.9% African American, 1.1% Native American, 19.0% Asian, 2.8% Pacific Islander, 9.3% from other races, and 6.0% from two or more races. Hispanic or Latino of any race were 17.5% of the population.

There were 7,157 households, of which 33.3% had children under the age of 18 living with them, 36.6% were married couples living together, 13.8% had a female householder with no husband present, 7.2% had a male householder with no wife present, and 42.4% were non-families. 32.2% of all households were made up of individuals, and 5.9% had someone living alone who was 65 years of age or older. The average household size was 2.64 and the average family size was 3.42.

The median age in the city was 33.8 years. 24.2% of residents were under the age of 18; 10.2% were between the ages of 18 and 24; 32.7% were from 25 to 44; 25.1% were from 45 to 64; and 8% were 65 years of age or older. The gender makeup of the city was 51.9% male and 48.1% female.

The median income for a household is $40,718, and the median income for a family of $42,442. Males had a median income of $35,525 versus $28,913 for females. The per capita income for the city was $22,354. About 8.8% of families and 12.7% of the population were below the poverty line, including 18.0% of those under age 18 and 7.7% of those ages 65 or over.

2000 census
Tukwila is one of King County's most diverse cities. As of the census of 2000, there were 17,181 people, 7,186 households, and 3,952 families living in the city. The population density was 1,927.0 people per square mile (743.7/km2). There were 7,725 housing units at an average density of 866.4 per square mile (334.4/km2). The racial makeup of the city was 58.63% White, 12.79% African American, 1.30% Native American, 10.88% Asian, 1.82% Pacific Islander, 8.06% from other races, and 6.51% from two or more races. Hispanic or Latino of any race was 13.56% of the population. On a New York Times article it is stated that the Tukwila School District consists of one of the most diverse range of students in Washington.

There were 7,186 households, out of which 28.2% had children under the age of 18 living with them, 36.4% were married couples living together, 12.4% had a female householder with no husband present, and 45.0% were non-families. 34.3% of all households were made up of individuals, and 5.6% had someone living alone who was 65 years of age or older. The average household size was 2.38 and the average family size was 3.09.

In the city the population was spread out, with 24.0% under the age of 18, 10.4% from 18 to 24, 37.3% from 25 to 44, 20.5% from 45 to 64, and 7.8% who were 65 years of age or older. The median age was 33 years. For every 100 females, there were 109.3 males. For every 100 females age 18 and over, there were 108.9 males.

Crime
According to the Uniform Crime Report statistics submitted to the Federal Bureau of Investigation (FBI) in 2020, there were 141 violent crimes and 3,023 property crimes. Of these, the violent crimes consisted of 3 murders, 27 rapes, 61 robberies, and 50 aggravated assaults, while 223 burglaries, 2,254 larceny-thefts, 533 motor vehicle thefts and 13 arsons defined the property offenses.

Industry
Tukwila's location at the confluence of rivers, freeways and railroads has made it an important center of commerce. Approximately 45,000 people work in Tukwila. Westfield Southcenter (formerly Southcenter Mall), Puget Sound's largest shopping complex, is located in the city, as well as a number of Boeing corporation facilities. Tukwila is also the location of corporate datacenters, including Microsoft, Internap, the University of Washington, Savvis, AboveNet, digital.forest, HopOne, and Fortress Colocation. Most of these are located at Sabey Corporation's Intergate Seattle campus near Boeing Field, 5 minutes away from Seattle-Tacoma International Airport. The city is served by Amtrak Cascades and Sound Transit's Sounder commuter rail at Tukwila station, while Sound Transit's Link light rail service serves Tukwila International Boulevard station.

Top employers
According to the city's 2021 Comprehensive Annual Financial Report, the top employers in the city are:

Government and politics

The city of Tukwila leans overwhelmingly Democratic like its neighbor Seattle and King County as a whole. It cast nearly three-quarters of its ballots for Joe Biden in the 2020 United States presidential election.

Education
Tukwila School District, which covers the vast majority of the city, has five schools: Cascade View Elementary School, Thorndyke Elementary School, Tukwila Elementary School, Showalter Middle School, and Foster High School. Foster High School is among the most racially diverse schools in the United States, with students from 50 countries speaking 45 languages .

Also in the city is Raisbeck Aviation High School, a public technical school operated by the Highline School District that opened in 2004. Other portions of the city are in the boundaries of the Highline School District, Renton School District, Kent School District, and Seattle Public Schools.

Sports 
The Seattle Seawolves, two-time champions of Major League Rugby, is based at the Starfire Sports complex, which also serves as the administrative and training home of the Seattle Sounders, and is the main ground of their affiliate Tacoma Defiance.

Culture
The Museum of Flight is an air and space museum located in the extreme northern part of Tukwila, adjacent to Boeing Field. Tukwila is also home to the Rainier Symphony, which conducts several performances each year at the Foster Performing Arts Center in Tukwila.

In the 1990s and 2000s, "visiting Tukwila" was used as a euphemism for marital intercourse by Seattle Times columnist Erik Lacitis.

Notable residents
William Cumming, artist and political activist
Zack Hudgins, former member of the Washington House of Representatives
Jim North, NFL player for the Washington Commanders
Mario Segale, real estate developer and namesake of video game character Mario

References

External links

 Official website
 Seattle Southside Regional Tourism Authority
 "Visiting Tukwila" takes on a whole new meaning", The Seattle Times

Cities in King County, Washington
Cities in the Seattle metropolitan area
Populated places established in 1853
1853 establishments in Washington Territory
Cities in Washington (state)
Washington placenames of Native American origin